Sophie Ogilvie (born 8 August 1999) is a British slalom canoeist who has competed at the international level since 2014.

She won a bronze medal in the C1 team event at the 2022 World Championships in Augsburg. She also won a gold and a silver medal in the C1 team event at the European Championships.

References

External links

Living people
Scottish female canoeists
1999 births
Medalists at the ICF Canoe Slalom World Championships